Maureen Helen Peters (born 4 January 1943) is a New Zealand former cricketer who played primarily as a right-arm medium bowler. She appeared in two Test matches and 16 One Day Internationals for New Zealand between 1973 and 1982. She played domestic cricket for Wellington.

Peters later served as a national selector.

References

External links

1943 births
Living people
Cricketers from Lower Hutt
New Zealand women cricketers
New Zealand women Test cricketers
New Zealand women One Day International cricketers
Wellington Blaze cricketers
Cricket selectors